Joyva is a chocolate and confectionery manufacturer headquartered in Brooklyn, New York.  "The house that sesame built" was started in 1907 by a newly immigrated Russian man named Nathan Radutzky who was looking to start a company producing and selling sesame-based halvah.  The company is still family-owned and continues to operate out of its Brooklyn location. Over the years, the company expanded its production to include a variety of sesame, marshmallow, and jelly-based candies.  Joyva candy is kosher parve, and is most commonly found in kosher delis or stores in Jewish neighborhoods.

Joyva is operated by Richard Radutzky and Sandy Wiener, who are cousins and descendants of the founders. Radutzky was graduated from Northwestern University in 1985, has been married to  Leslye Sussman-Radutzky since 1988, and is a former actor. Richard Radutzky and his father, Milton, received special thanks in the credits of The Kids Are All Right (film).

Products

Joyva manufactures a variety of confections, but its flagship product is halvah. The company has a line of halvah products ranging from halvah bars, halvah in cans, and loaves of halvah with nuts. The halvah can be plain (vanilla), covered in chocolate or have chocolate mixed in (marble).

Products that are not halvah-based either incorporate jelly, marshmallow, or sesame.  Their jelly-based candy is chocolate-covered, uses either raspberry or orange jelly, and is made into rings or bars. They also offer Sesame Crunch, a candy composed of brittled sesame seeds and various chocolate-covered marshmallow products, such as Marshmallow Twists.

Joyva is the largest halvah producer in the United States.

Notes

External links
 Joyva company page
 candyblog.net Joyva Joys review

American chocolate companies
Confectionery companies of the United States
Food and drink companies established in 1907
Kosher food
Jews and Judaism in Brooklyn
Russian-Jewish culture in New York City
Manufacturing companies based in New York City
Companies based in Brooklyn
1907 establishments in New York City